Onceroxenus is a genus of crustaceans belonging to the monotypic family Onceroxenidae.

The species of this genus are found in Western Europe.

Species:

Onceroxenus birdi 
Onceroxenus curtus

References

Crustaceans
Crustacean genera